Sir George Blount (1512/13 – 1581) was an English politician.

He was born the son of John Blount of Kinlet, Shropshire. He succeeded his father in 1531 and was knighted in 1544.

He was a Member (MP) of the Parliament of England for Shropshire in 1545, 1547 and 1571; for Bridgnorth in October 1553 and 1559; for Much Wenlock in November 1554, 1555, 1558, 1563 and 1572.

He was appointed High Sheriff of Staffordshire for 1552–3, 1572–3 and High Sheriff of Shropshire for 1563–4.

References

1513 births
1581 deaths
High Sheriffs of Staffordshire
High Sheriffs of Shropshire
English MPs 1545–1547
English MPs 1547–1552
English MPs 1553 (Mary I)
English MPs 1554–1555
English MPs 1555
English MPs 1558
English MPs 1559
English MPs 1563–1567
English MPs 1571
English MPs 1572–1583